The Panel of Chairs (formerly the Chairman's Panel) are members of the House of Commons of the United Kingdom responsible for chairing public bill committees and other General Committees, as well as debates in Westminster Hall, the parallel debating chamber. The three Deputy Speakers, who are automatically members, are responsible for chairing Committees of the Whole House. Other members may act as temporary chairs of Committees of the Whole House. The Panel is not itself generally thought of as a committee, but it does have the power to meet to consider matters relating to procedure in the general committees and report its findings to the House of Commons.

Members
The panel consists of the three Deputy Speakers and no fewer than 10 MPs appointed by the Speaker, two of whom are appointed pursuant to section 1(3) of the Parliament Act 1911 by the Committee of Selection to be consulted by the Speaker before declaring a bill to be a money bill.

Members of the Panel of Chairs, as of 15 October 2021:
The Panel of Chairs was nominated by the Speaker on 22 June 2017:

Sir Lindsay Hoyle (Labour), Chairman of Ways and Means
Dame Eleanor Laing 	(Conservative), First Deputy Chairman of Ways and Means
Dame Rosie Winterton 	(Labour), Second Deputy Chairman of Ways and Means
Sir David Amess 	(Conservative)
Ian Austin 	        (Independent, previously Labour)
Adrian Bailey 	(Labour (Co-op))
Sir Henry Bellingham	(Conservative)
Clive Betts 	        (Labour)
Peter Bone 	        (Conservative)
Sir Graham Brady 	(Conservative)
Karen Buck	        (Labour)
Sir Christopher Chope 	(Conservative)
Sir David Crausby 	(Labour)
Geraint Davies 	        (Labour (Co-op))
Philip Davies 	        (Conservative)
Nadine Dorries	(Conservative)
Nigel Evans 	        (Conservative)
Sir Roger Gale 	        (Conservative)
Mike Gapes 	        (Labour (Co-op))
Dame Cheryl Gillan 	(Conservative)
James Gray 	        (Conservative)
David Hanson 	        (Labour)
Philip Hollobone 	(Conservative)
Stewart Hosie 	        (Scottish National Party)
George Howarth 	(Labour)
Sir Edward Leigh 	(Conservative)
Steve McCabe 	        (Labour)
Siobhain McDonagh 	(Labour)
Anne Main 	        (Conservative)
Madeleine Moon 	(Labour)
Albert Owen 	        (Labour)
Ian Paisley 	        (Democratic Unionist Party)
Mark Pritchard 	        (Conservative)
Laurence Robertson 	(Conservative)
Andrew Rosindell 	(Conservative)
Joan Ryan 	        (Labour)
Virendra Sharma	(Labour)
Gary Streeter 	(Conservative)
Graham Stringer 	(Labour)
Charles Walker 	(Conservative)
Phil Wilson 	        (Labour)

As of December 2015, the members were as follows:

 Lindsay Hoyle (Labour), Chairman of Ways and Means
 Eleanor Laing (Conservative), First Deputy Chairman of Ways and Means
 Natascha Engel (Labour), Second Deputy Chairman of Ways and Means
 David Amess (Conservative)
 Adrian Bailey (Labour)
 Clive Betts (Labour)
 Peter Bone (Conservative)
 Graham Brady (Conservative)
 Karen Buck (Labour)
 Christopher Chope (Conservative)
 David Crausby (Labour)
 Geraint Davies (Labour)
 Philip Davies (Conservative)
 Nadine Dorries (Conservative)
 Nigel Evans (Conservative)
 Roger Gale (Conservative)
 Mike Gapes (Labour)
 Cheryl Gillan (Conservative)
 James Gray (Conservative)
 Fabian Hamilton (Labour)
 David Hanson (Labour)
 Philip Hollobone (Conservative)
 George Howarth (Labour)
 Edward Leigh (Conservative)
 Anne Main (Conservative)
 Steve McCabe (Labour))
 Alan Meale (Labour))
 Madeleine Moon (Labour))
 David Nuttall (Conservative)
 Albert Owen (Labour)
 Andrew Percy (Conservative)
 Mark Pritchard (Conservative)
 Andrew Rosindell (Conservative)
 Gary Streeter (Conservative)
 Graham Stringer (Labour)
 Andrew Turner (Conservative)
 Valerie Vaz (Labour)
 Charles Walker (Conservative)
 Phil Wilson (Labour)

References

Committees of the British House of Commons